Roman Volodymyrovych Hontyuk, also spelled Roman Gontyuk, (born 2 February 1984) is an olympic medalist from Ukraine. He won a silver medal in the half-middleweight (81 kg) division at the 2004 Summer Olympics and bronze medal in the half-middleweight (81 kg) division at the 2008 Summer Olympics in Beijing. Hontyuk is the Merited Master of Sports of Ukraine.

Olympic Journey at Athens 2004

Hontyuk's Olympic debut started with his match against Adil Belgaid of Morocco, which Hontyuk won. Making his way through the competition, he defeated Reza Chahkhandagh of Iran and world champion Florian Wanner. In the semifinals against Robert Krawczyk of Poland, Roman won by ippon with only 5 seconds left in the match and headed to the final. In the gold medal match against Ilias Iliadis, Ilias defeated Roman by ippon, leaving Hontyuk with the silver medal.

Achievements

References

External links
 
 Videos of Roman Gontyuk in action (judovision.org)

1984 births
Living people
People from Nadvirna
Ukrainian male judoka
Judoka at the 2004 Summer Olympics
Judoka at the 2008 Summer Olympics
Judoka at the 2012 Summer Olympics
Olympic judoka of Ukraine
Olympic bronze medalists for Ukraine
Olympic silver medalists for Ukraine
Olympic medalists in judo
Medalists at the 2008 Summer Olympics
Dynamo sports society athletes
Medalists at the 2004 Summer Olympics
Sportspeople from Ivano-Frankivsk Oblast
21st-century Ukrainian people